Simone Bolelli and Máximo González defeated Novak Djokovic and Carlos Gómez-Herrera by virtue of walkover to win the doubles tennis title at the 2021 Mallorca Championships after a foot injury sustained by Gómez-Herrera forced him and Djokovic to withdraw before the final match. It marked Bolelli and González's third title of the season together.

This was the inaugural edition of the tournament.

Seeds

Draw

Draw

References

External links
Main draw

2021 ATP Tour
2021 Doubles